Kevin Mendy (born May 18, 1992) is a French basketball player who plays for French Pro A league club Le Mans. He was born in Meulan, France.

References

1992 births
Living people
French men's basketball players
Le Mans Sarthe Basket players
21st-century French people